Bengt-jonsellia is a genus of flowering plants belonging to the family Brassicaceae.

Its native range is Madagascar.

Species:

Bengt-jonsellia laurentii 
Bengt-jonsellia tsaratananae

References

Brassicaceae
Brassicaceae genera